The Pasquotank River   is a coastal water-body in Northeastern North Carolina in the United States. Located between Camden and Pasquotank counties, the Pasquotank connects directly to Albemarle Sound and is part of the Intracoastal Waterway via Elizabeth City.

Machelhe Island is a river island on the Pasquotank River.

History
The name "Pasquotank" is derived from pashetanki, a Carolina Algonquian word translated as "where the current forks." The river was originally controlled by the Secotan people, and later gained importance in trade and shipping during the colonial period of North Carolina.

The Battle of Elizabeth City was fought on the Pasquotank River where a small Confederate fleet was sunk in defense of the City. The Confederate ships sunk on the Pasquotank River in the battle were the CSS Black Warrior, CSS Fanny, CSS Sea Bird, and the CSS Appomattox.

Some principal industries along the Pasquotank were transport, logging, and oyster harvesting. Since the twentieth century, the commercial viability of the river has declined, as more traffic uses the Intracoastal Waterway by way of Coinjock. The river is now primarily frequented by pleasure boaters.

References

North Carolina State Library. July 1997. “County History.” North Carolina Encyclopedia.   18 Nov. 2000.

External links
 Elizabeth City Area Convention & Visitors Bureau
 Elizabeth City Area CVB's Blog
 

Rivers of North Carolina
Bodies of water of Pasquotank County, North Carolina
Bodies of water of Camden County, North Carolina
Tributaries of Albemarle Sound